Faust Is Last is the 10th studio album by the German krautrock group Faust, released in 2010 by Hans Joachim Irmler's version of the band. It is Irmler's last album released as Faust; the less experimental, more lyrics-driven version of Faust still continues to release new music though.

Track listing

 "Brumm und Blech"
 "Imperial Lover"
 "Feed the Greed"
 "Chrome"
 "Soft Prunes"
 "Nachtfahrt"
 "Hit Me"
 "Dolls and Brawls"
 "Drug Wipe"
 "Steinbrand"
 "I Don't Buy Your Shit No More"
 "Babylon"
 "X-Ray"
 "Cluster für Cluster"
 "Day Out"
 "Karneval"
 "Ozean"
 "Softone"
 "In But Out"
 "GhosTrain"
 "Vorübergehen"
 "Primitivelona"

References

2010 albums
Faust (band) albums